Don José Malcampo y Monge, 3rd Marquess of San Rafael (13 January 1828– 23 May 1880) was a Spanish noble, admiral and politician who participated in the Revolution of 1868 as a seaman and served as Prime Minister of Spain in 1871, during the reign of King Amadeo I.

Malcampo was born in San Fernando, Cádiz.  In the course of his career, he held other important military and political offices such as Minister of State in 1871, President of the Council of State and Captain and Governor General of the Philippines from 1874 to 1877, in the reign of King Alfonso XII. During his governorship, the city of Jolo was taken from the Sultanate of Sulu, and the Marquess was granted the titles of Count of Jolo and Viscount of Mindanao as victory titles. He founded the first Masonic Lodge in Cavite. It was called La Primer Luz Filipina. He died at Sanlúcar de Barrameda.

References
Spanish Senate. Personal dossier of D. José Malcampo, Marquis of San Rafael

 

Marquesses of Spain
Counts of Spain
Viscounts of Spain
Prime Ministers of Spain
Foreign ministers of Spain
Captains General of the Philippines
People from San Fernando, Cádiz
1828 births
1880 deaths
Constitutional Party (Spain) politicians